The Australian Space Agency is an agency under the Australian Government responsible for the development of Australia's commercial space industry, coordinating domestic activities, identifying opportunities and facilitating international space engagement that include Australian stakeholders. Its headquarters, opened in February 2020, are located in Lot Fourteen in Adelaide, the capital city of South Australia. The Australian Space Discovery Centre, where space technology is exhibited and information sessions provided to the public, is on site.

History 
As of 2008, Australia was the only OECD country without a space agency other than Iceland, with the preceding National Space Program and Australian Space Office (ASO) having been disbanded by the federal government in 1996. A government report from the Australian Senate Standing Committee on Economics noted that Australia was "missing out on opportunities" and recommended that an agency immediately be developed.

In 2009, the Space Policy Unit funded the Australian Space Research Program over three years.

On 16 September 2016, Andrea Boyd, an Australian working as a flight operations engineer for the International Space Station (ISS) in Cologne, Germany, delivered an address at the Global Access Partners Summit in Parliament House, Sydney, urging Australia to grasp the commercial opportunities of the new space market and protect its national sovereignty by establishing a national space agency. In response, Australian policy institute Global Access Partners created a taskforce including Andrea Boyd, former astronauts Dr Andy Thomas AO and Prof Gregory Chamitoff, as well as Australian and international scientists, entrepreneurs, innovators, financial analysts and legal experts. The taskforce was chaired by Dr Jason Held, founder of Saber Astronautics. The taskforce, co-funded by the federal Department of Industry, Innovation and Science, advocated the creation of a commercially focused Australian space agency and delivered its report to the Australian Government in August 2017.

On 25 September 2017, at the International Astronautical Congress in Adelaide, Senator Simon Birmingham announced that the Australian Government would be launching a national space agency following an expert reference group investigation led by Megan Clark, former chief executive of CSIRO.

As part of the Australian Government's 2018 budget announcement, AU$26 million in seed funding over four years from 2018 was included to establish the Australian Space Agency, with a further AU$15 million for international space investment starting from 2019.

The budget was criticised for being inadequate by private Australian space companies including Delta-V and Gilmour Space Technologies, and space archaeologist Alice Gorman noted that low-budget attempts at starting an Australian space agency have failed in the past.

On 14 May 2018, Senator Michaelia Cash officially announced the launch of the Australian Space Agency, identifying 1 July 2018 as the commencement date of the agency, with Megan Clark as the inaugural head of the agency for at least the first year.

On 12 December 2018, Prime Minister Scott Morrison officially announced that Adelaide would become home to the Australian Space Agency. It would be located at Lot Fourteen, the site of the former Royal Adelaide Hospital, near the north-eastern corner of Adelaide city centre, in 2019.

The agency opened its office on 19 February 2020. It aims to triple the size of the Australian space industry and create 20,000 new jobs by 2030.

On 13 October 2021, the Australian Government announced an agreement with NASA whereby Australian researchers and scientists would build a rover that will be sent to the moon by 2026.

In March 2022, the agency and the University of Adelaide stated that they'd work together on Mars exploration.

Description
The Australian Space Agency is located in the McEwin Building on Lot Fourteen, a technology hub in Adelaide city centre.

The Australian Space Discovery Centre is co-located with the agency.

The work was commissioned by Lot Fourteen, and is located in front of the Australian Space Discovery Centre.

Responsibilities 
The Agency has six primary responsibilities:

 Providing national policy and strategic advice on the civil space sector.
 Coordinating Australia's domestic civil space sector activities.
 Supporting the growth of Australia's space industry and the use of space across the broader economy.
 Leading international civil space engagement.
 Administering space activities legislation and delivering on our international obligations.
 Inspiring the Australian community and the next generation of space entrepreneurs.

The Australian Space Agency differentiates itself from other national space programs in its stated focus on private development and businesses rather than state driven operations (contrasting with NASA and the European Space Agency).

Governance 
The leader of the agency is titled the Head.

See also

 Australia's Satellite Utilisation Policy
 List of government space agencies
 Woomera Rocket Range Complex
 National Space Program

References

External links 
 Official Website

Space agencies
Space programme of Australia
2018 establishments in Australia
Government agencies established in 2018
Commonwealth Government agencies of Australia